Harmony Santana is an American film actress. She is most noted for her appearance in the 2011 film Gun Hill Road, for which she garnered an Independent Spirit Award nomination for Best Supporting Actress, and became the first openly transgender actress to be nominated for a major acting award in the United States. In addition to Gun Hill Road, Santana has also had supporting roles in Eating Out 4: Drama Camp,  Eating Out 5: The Open Weekend, and the Susie Singer Carter-directed short film "My Mom and the Girl."

At the time of her performance in Gun Hill Road, Santana lived at Green Chimneys, a group home for LGBT youth in Manhattan. She was discovered by director Rashaad Ernesto Green at the Queens Pride parade after he had difficulty finding the right performer for the role. She is of mixed Puerto Rican and Dominican heritage.

See also
 LGBT culture in New York City
 List of self-identified LGBTQ New Yorkers

References

External links

American film actresses
Hispanic and Latino American actresses
American people of Dominican Republic descent
Actresses from New York City
Transgender actresses
Living people
American LGBT actors
LGBT Hispanic and Latino American people
American people of Puerto Rican descent
Year of birth missing (living people)